Procometis hylonoma is a moth in the family Autostichidae. It was described by Edward Meyrick in 1890. It is found in Australia, where it has been recorded from New South Wales, Victoria, and South Australia.

The wingspan is 18–25 mm. The forewings are white, more or less irrorated (sprinkled) irregularly with ochreous fuscous, sometimes suffused with whitish ochreous on the dorsal half. There is a fuscous dot on the fold beneath the middle, and another in the disc at two-thirds, sometimes very indistinct. The hindwings are light fuscous, darker towards the hindmargin, paler and more whitish ochreous towards the base.

References

Moths described in 1890
Procometis
Taxa named by Edward Meyrick